(December 25, 1901 – July 23, 2005) was the seventh National President of the Boy Scouts of Japan from 1974 to 2003, and served on the World Scout Committee of the World Organization of the Scout Movement.

Background
A count/earl as a member of a Kazoku, he sat in the House of Peers and was known as the "last school friend of the Showa Emperor".

In 1977, Watanabe was awarded the 124th Bronze Wolf, awarded by the World Scout Committee for exceptional services to world Scouting, at the 26th World Scout Conference. In 1979 he also received the highest distinction of the Scout Association of Japan, the Golden Pheasant Award.

References

External links

Recipients of the Bronze Wolf Award
Scouting in Japan
1901 births
2005 deaths
World Scout Committee members
Members of the House of Peers (Japan)
Japanese centenarians
Men centenarians
Chief Scouts